The sulphur-bellied bulbul (Iole palawanensis) is a songbird species in the bulbul family, Pycnonotidae. It is endemic to Palawan (Philippines). Its natural habitat is subtropical or tropical moist lowland forests. It is not considered a threatened species by the IUCN.

Taxonomy and systematics
The sulphur-bellied bulbul was originally described in the genus Criniger. Some authorities have classified the sulphur-bellied bulbul in the genera Hypsipetes and Ixos. Alternate names for the sulphur-bellied bulbul include the golden-eyed bulbul and olive bulbul. The latter name should not to be confused with the species bearing the same name, Iole virescens.

Footnotes

References
 
 Gregory, Steven M. (2000): Nomenclature of the Hypsipetes Bulbuls (Pycnonotidae). Forktail 16: 164–166. PDF fulltext
 Moyle, Robert G. & Marks, Ben D. (2006): Phylogenetic relationships of the bulbuls (Aves: Pycnonotidae) based on mitochondrial and nuclear DNA sequence data. Mol. Phylogenet. Evol. 40(3): 687–695.  (HTML abstract)
 Pasquet, Éric; Han, Lian-Xian; Khobkhet, Obhas & Cibois, Alice (2001): Towards a molecular systematics of the genus Criniger, and a preliminary phylogeny of the bulbuls (Aves, Passeriformes, Pycnonotidae). Zoosystema 23(4): 857–863. PDF fulltext

sulphur-bellied bulbul
Birds of Palawan
Endemic birds of the Philippines
sulphur-bellied bulbul
Taxa named by Arthur Hay, 9th Marquess of Tweeddale
Taxonomy articles created by Polbot